Ylenia is a given name, and is the first name of:

 Ylenia Carrisi (b. 1970), Italian TV celebrity
 Ylenia Lenhard (b. 2002), Swiss murder victim
 Ylenia Scapin (b. 1975), Italian judoka